Ferdinand Pascual Aguilar (born February 5, 1953), better known as Freddie Aguilar, Ka Freddie Aguilar, or simply Ka Freddie, is a Filipino folk musician, singer-songwriter. Regarded as one of the pillars and icons of Original Pilipino Music (OPM). He is best known for his rendition of "Bayan Ko", which became the anthem of the opposition against the regime of Ferdinand Marcos during the 1986 People Power Revolution, and for his song "Anak", the best-selling Philippine music record of all time. He is heavily associated with Pinoy rock.

He is well known internationally, claiming fame as one of the best musician-songwriters from the Philippines.

Early life
Freddie Aguilar's musical beginnings started when he was young. When he was 9-years-old, Aguilar played his first guitar. By the time he was 19-years-old, Freddie Aguilar performed on stage with Joshua Alcantara for the first time.

Freddie Aguilar studied Electrical Engineering at De Guzman Institute of Technology but did not finish the degree program. Instead he pursued music, became a street musician, and then a folk club and bar musician.

At the age of 18, Aguilar parted ways with his family and quit college. After realizing and regretting his mistakes five years later, he composed the song Anak.

Influences
Freddie Aguilar's influences include British and American folk-rock stars like Cat Stevens and James Taylor. He is also heavily influenced by his Filipino heritage, nationalist feelings, and tries to constitute a musical exploration of the Filipino ethos.

Career

International acclaim
Aguilar's "Anak" not only broke the Philippine record charts in 1979, but it also hit the no. 1 spot in Japan and achieved considerable popularity in other countries as Angola, Japan, Malaysia, Hong Kong, and parts of Western Europe.
The song has become so famous that, by some counts, it has been recorded in as many as a hundred versions in 23 languages throughout the world. Billboard reported that the song was the number two world hit of the 1980s. As of 2006, it was unsurpassed as the highest-selling record of Philippine music history.

Political activism
Even before Aguilar's rendition of "Bayan Ko," Aguilar created and performed songs targeted at social injustices. His album, Magdalena included songs about a girl forced into prostitution as a result of poverty and the Christian-Muslim clashes in his song Mindanao. After the album, Freddie Aguilar also sang about the injustices suffered by the powerless, poverty, and the arrogance of superpowers in a song about the U.S. and Russia.

Five years after the composition of "Anak", Freddie Aguilar joined protests against the Marcos regime and began writing and performing songs that criticized the excesses of the government. Some of the songs that caused him to be banned from mainstream media include: "Kata-rungan" or "Justice" (speaking for the unjustly accused), "Pangako" ("Promise") (a leader's unfulfilled pledges to an abandoned people), and "Luzvi-minda" (an acronym for Luzon, Visayas, Mindanao, calling on Filipinos to wake up to the reality of oppression). One of the songs he was most remembered for during that time was his interpretation of "Bayan Ko" ("My Country"), in which he added a verse to the original piece.

"Bayan Ko" (My Country)
In 1978, Aguilar first recorded "Bayan Ko" in a patriotic effort to, in his words, "jolt back those who were starting to forget who we really are." He also provided a rendition of the song as it is inspiring and gave him excitement and a surge of power. The song was originally composed in 1928 by Constancio de Guzman, with lyrics by poet Jose Corazon de Jesus, during a time of struggle for Philippine independence from US occupation. It emerged once again during the Marcos regime as the unofficial anthem of the emergent "people" of the "People Power", the new democratic nation opposed to authoritarianism that is widely credited with the deposing of Ferdinand Marcos. In 1983, the assassination of Benigno "Ninoy" Aquino triggered massive demonstrations against the Marcos dictatorship, and Aguilar's rendition of "Bayan Ko" was blared on the radio and speakers mounted on jeepneys throughout the streets of Manila and the provinces of the Philippines. At the funeral of Senator Aquino, Freddie Aguilar sang "Bayan Ko" and felt that Aquino was a man of action who even gave his life for the freedom of the Philippines. During the performance, Freddie Aguilar did not feel scared anymore and felt strong and confident. He then decided to join the cause as well. Aguilar, along with APO Hiking Society and other Pinoy pop musicians who took a stand against dictatorship, joined other protest singers in music and street performances as part of the anti-Marcos rallies.

A few years later, Aguilar campaigned for the presidential candidacy of Corazon Aquino in the national election that would lead to the 1986 revolt.

Aguilar mentioned in an interview with ABS-CBN News that the lyrics of the song combines the love the Filipinos have for their country, commemorate the Aquino family, and commitment to the country. Even in this modern time, Filipinos will identify "Bayan Ko" as the nation's protest anthem.

Present day
On January 18, 2008, Aguilar received the Asia Star Award from the Asia Model Award Festival in Korea.

Aguilar still lives in the Philippines, and continues to perform. He has moved to his own place dubbed "Ka Freddie's".. He still has a strong following in the Philippines and among many Filipinos living overseas.

Aguilar has been advocating for the creation of a new department called "Department of Culture and Arts." During the campaign and the Inauguration of president Rodrigo Duterte, Aguilar performed “Para sa Tunay na Pagbabago”, which is one of Duterte's campaign jingles to the tune of Ipaglalaban Ko. Aguilar is President Duterte's favorite singer.

Aguilar ran for senator in 2019. Though running as an independent candidate, his candidacy was endorsed by President Duterte. However, he lost, placing 30th out of 12 seats up for election.

Personal life

In 1978, he married Josephine Queipo and with her had 4 children: Maegan, Jonan, Isabella, and Jeriko.

On October 17, 2013, Aguilar openly admitted, in spite of the controversy that followed, that he is in a relationship with a 16-year-old girl, Jovi Gatdula Albao (Muslim name Sittie Mariam), with plans to marry and even have children, as his partner insisted that she is willing to have a baby.

On November 22, 2013, Aguilar, under Islamic rites, married his partner in Buluan, Maguindanao. Aguilar had converted to Islam six months prior to these reports, so that he could marry his then 16-year-old girlfriend. His Muslim name is Abdul Farid.

On January 3, 2018, Aguilar's residence in North Fairview, Quezon City was destroyed by a fire, which was reported to have started at his music room. Aguilar was at "Ka Freddie's", his bar & restaurant along Tomas Morato Avenue, during the fire. His wife, son Jonan, and mother-in-law were all inside his residence during the fire, but were able to escape unharmed with the help of their neighbors.

Discography
{|class="wikitable"
!Year
!Title
! abbr="Label" | Record label
|-
| 1978
| Anak
| Vicor Music/Sunshine
|-
| 1979
| Freddie Aguilar
| PDU
|-
| 1980
| Diyosa
| Ugat Tunog ng Lahi/Vicor Music
|-
| 1980
| Freddie Aguilar (US release)
| RCA Records
|-
| 1983
| Magdalena
| G. Records International
|-
| 1987
| Freddie Aguilar – Anak - Double "Best Of" Album 
| Panarecord International 
|-
| 1987
| EDSA
| Ivory Music 
|-
| 1988
| Sariling Atin
| Alpha Music
|-
| 1989
| Hala Bira
| Alpha Music
|-
| 1990
| Heart of Asia
| OctoArts International
|-
| 1991
| Kumusta Ka
| AMP
|-
| 1991
| Freddie Aguilar
| AMP
|-
| 1992
| Pagbabalik Himig
| Vicor Music
|-
| 1993
| Minamahal Kita
| Alpha Music
|-
| 1994
| Anak (CD re-issue)
| Vicor Music
|-
| 1994
| Diwa Ng Pasko
| Alpha Music
|-
| 1995
| Fifteen Years of Freddie Aguilar (AMP release)
| Aguilar Music
|-
| 1995
| The Best of Freddie Aguilar
| Alpha Music
|-
| 1997
| Freddie Aguilar Live! Global Tour (Vols. 1, 2, 3)
| Aguilar Music / Vicor Music 
|}

Singles
In chronological order:
1978 "Anak"
1976 "Alaala"
1980 "Pulubi"
1980 "Bulag, Pipi at Bingi"
1981 "Ang Buhay Nga Naman Ng Tao"
1984 "Pinoy"
1978 "Bayan Ko"
1983 "Magdalena"
1983 "Mindanao"
1986 "Katarungan"
1989 "Luzviminda"
1989 "Pangako"
1987 "'Di Ka Nag-iisa"
1985 "Mga Bata Sa Negros"
1988 "Estudyante Blues"
1985 "Ipaglalaban Ko"
1993 "Minamahal Kita"
1994 "Kumusta Ka"
1994 "Pasko Ang Damdamin"
1994 "Mga Pilipino Kong Mahal"
1994 "Ang Bansa Kong Maligaya"

Music videos
Anak (1980, new live version recorded by MYX Live in 2005)
Sa Ngalan Ng Ama (1980)
Magdalena (1984)

Awards

See also
Philippine folk music
People Power Revolution

References

External links
Manong Freddie Aguilar's official Web site
Recordings on WhiteAlien website of Freddie live at Ka Freddie's

1953 births
Living people
20th-century Filipino male singers
Baritones
Converts to Islam from Roman Catholicism
Filipino folk singers
Filipino former Christians
Filipino Muslims
Filipino rock singers
Filipino songwriters
Folk-pop singers
Ilocano people
Manila sound musicians
People from Isabela (province)
Vicor Music artists